2,5-Bis(hydroxymethyl)pyrrole is an organic chemical compound with formula , or .  Its molecule can be described as that of pyrrole  with hydroxymethyl groups  replacing the two hydrogen atoms adjacent to the nitrogen atom.

The compound is a white solid, soluble in water and acetone.  It is stable in alkaline solutions, but otherwise tends to polymerize by self-condensation. The compound was used as an intermediate in the synthesis of hexahydroporphine ("unsubstituted porphyrinogen"), the core of uroporphyrinogen III, precursor of many critically important biological products such as hemoglobin and chlorophyll.

Preparation
The compound can be synthesized by formylation of pyrrole followed by reduction of the resulting pyrrolecarboxaldehyde.

References

Pyrroles
Diols